Kahn-e Shah Salim (also Romanized as Kahn-e Shāh Salīm; also known as Chāh Salīm and Shāh Salīm) is a village in Zaboli Rural District, in the Central District of Mehrestan County, Sistan and Baluchestan Province, Iran. At the 2006 census, its population was 329, in 58 families.

References 

Populated places in Mehrestan County